Fathi Mohammed Ali (born 25 July 1940) is an Egyptian former tennis player. 

A silver medalist at the 1963 Mediterranean Games, he is now a tennis coach based in Dreieich, Germany. In the past, he coached the Davis Cup teams of Libya (in two stints: 1968–1973 and 1978–1980) and Kuwait (1973–1978).

References

External links
 

1940 births
Living people
Egyptian male tennis players
Mediterranean Games silver medalists for Egypt
Mediterranean Games medalists in tennis
Competitors at the 1963 Mediterranean Games
Egyptian expatriates in Germany
African Games medalists in tennis
African Games bronze medalists for Egypt
Competitors at the 1965 All-Africa Games
20th-century Egyptian people